Metin Erol (born 24 January 1987) is a Turkish footballer who plays as a goalkeeper.

Career
Born in İzmit, Erol began playing youth football with Kocaelispor. He signed a professional contract in 2005, and would become Kocaelispor's starting goalkeeper by the 2010-11 season. Erol made two appearances in the Turkish Süper Lig for Kocaelispor before leaving the club in the summer of 2011.

References

External links
 
 

1987 births
Sportspeople from İzmit
Living people
Turkish footballers
Association football goalkeepers
Kocaelispor footballers
Gölcükspor footballers
TKİ Tavşanlı Linyitspor footballers
Fethiyespor footballers
Ümraniyespor footballers
Giresunspor footballers
Tuzlaspor players
Ankaraspor footballers
Süper Lig players
TFF First League players
TFF Second League players